Friedrichshafen ( or ; Low Alemannic: Hafe or Fridrichshafe) is a city on the northern shoreline of Lake Constance (the Bodensee) in Southern Germany, near the borders of both Switzerland and Austria. It is the district capital (Kreisstadt) of the Bodensee district in the federal state of Baden-Württemberg. Friedrichshafen has a population of about 58,000.

History

19th and early 20th century
Friedrichshafen was established in 1811 as part of the new Kingdom of Württemberg, an ally of France during the Napoleonic Wars. It was named for King Frederick I of Württemberg, who privileged it as a free port and transshipment point for the kingdom's Swiss trade. Friedrichshafen was created from the former city of Buchhorn, whose coat of arms it adopted. The new city also incorporated the former village of Hofen, whose monastery was refurbished to serve as the summer residence of the Württemberger kings.

King William I continued improving the city, including the purchase of the steamship Wilhelm. Ministers and senior officials built villas around the royal castle, and many foreign tourists visited the city as well, including Tsar Alexander II of Russia. The first track laid by the Royal Württemberg State Railways connected the port to Ravensburg in 1847. Heilbronn was connected in 1850, and a ferry to Romanshorn in Switzerland began operating in 1869. Despite their previous opposition to Prussia, under the federal structure of the German Empire, Württemberg and Friedrichshafen continued to enjoy some special privileges following their incorporation into Germany following the Franco-Prussian War.

Ferdinand von Zeppelin established his famous dirigible factory at the end of the 19th century. The 128m-long LZ1 airship rose from its mooring on July 2, 1900. Other aviation companies, including Maybach, also arose in Friedrichshafen to help service the industry, which received a major impetus from World War I. Following the Treaty of Versailles, the Kingdom of Württemberg was dissolved but the deposed royal family continued in their possession of their castle in Friedrichshafen, despite a workers' revolution there in November, 1918.

World War II

Friedrichshafen served the Nazi regime as a resort for workers. The presence of Zeppelin, Maybach, Dornier, and Zahnradfabrik made it an important German industrial center during World War II. Between 1942 and 1945, the factories used slave labor of hundreds of concentration camp prisoners from Dachau and Dora-Mittelbau. They were housed first at Zeppelin's hangar and then, following its destruction during a raid, the V-2 factory Raderach. The prisoners were also used to dig tunnels near Friedrichshafen to protect production sites from the repeated bombing.

Between June 1943 and February 1945, the city was targeted for Allied bombing attacks. The most accurate took place on April 28, 1944, and destroyed most of the old town center. Approximately two-thirds of the city was destroyed over the course of the war.

Modern Germany
Following World War II, Friedrichshafen was part of the French occupation zone before its incorporation into Baden-Württemberg, West Germany. In the aftermath of the war, Maybach and many other aviation companies turned to automobile construction, while Claudius Dornier purchased Theodor Kober's failed Flugzeugbau Friedrichshafen and established Dornier Flugzeugwerke. Owing to the provisions of the Versailles treaty, many of the planes were initially produced in Italy, Spain, the Netherlands or Japan, but resumed work at its Friedrichshafen and other German factories following the rise of the Nazi regime. The 1937 Hindenburg disaster and a subsequent embargo on sending American helium to Germany, however, effectively ended the production of German dirigibles. The German aeronautics industry was again banned for many years after the war, and companies again failed or shifted production.

The city's principal recovery dates to its establishment as the administrative seat of the Bodenseekreis district of West Germany, in 1973. The last French troops withdrew from their "Durand de Villers" Quarter (Quartier Durand de Villers) in 1992.

Geography

Geographical location 
Friedrichshafen is located on a gently curved bay on the north shore of Lake Constance and on the southwest edge of the Schussen. The city is over an altitude of 395.2 m above sea level. NHH on the shores of Lake Constance up to 501.6 m in Ailingen. The core city is located not far to the west of the confluence of the Rotach and Lake Constance. Coming from Oberteuringen, this river reaches the city west of the village of Ailingen and flows through some smaller districts before it flows into the lake on the eastern edge of the city center. The somewhat larger Schussen touches the northeast corner of the urban area.

Neighboring communities 
The following municipalities border the city of Friedrichshafen:

Immenstaad, Markdorf, Oberteuringen, Ravensburg, Meckenbeuren, Tettnang and Eriskich.

Climate 
Friedrichshafen's climate is mainly influenced by the Lake Constance and the nearby Alps. Compared to the Hinterland, the temperatures are rather mild. The proximity to the Alps creates foehn winds and sometimes strong thunderstorms. In addition, fog often forms in winter.

Border with Baden 
The border line between the former states of Baden and Württemberg ran on the Grenzbach between Friedrichshafen, Fischbach and Immenstaad. Remains of the "Grenzhof" can still be found between the Bundesstraße 31 and the nature-protected shore zone.

Economy

Aviation

Airship construction in the first third of the 20th century attracted considerable industry and contributed significantly to Friedrichshafen's relative prosperity. Friedrichshafen is best known for having been home to the Luftschiffbau Zeppelin Airship Company, the aircraft manufacturer Dornier Flugzeugwerke, ZF Friedrichshafen, a manufacturer of transmission systems and MTU Friedrichshafen GmbH, the engine manufacturing company founded by Wilhelm Maybach.

Ferdinand von Zeppelin, who was born in Konstanz (Constance), originally had his airships built in a floating airship hangar on the lake which could be aligned with the wind to support the difficult launch procedure of rigid airship flight. Today there is a large Zeppelin Museum in Friedrichshafen sited near the lake shore. In recent years the company ZLT Zeppelin Luftschifftechnik GmbH, also located in Friedrichshafen, is the constructor of small, semi-rigid airships designed by the Zeppelin firm, named (called Zeppelin NT), by using modern technology. These airships can be booked for sightseeing tours above Lake Constance.

Airbus Defence and Space maintains a site outside Friedrichshafen in Immenstaad am Bodensee, which is considered today as the successor of the Dornier Flugzeugwerke company. The Dornier Museum is located at the Friedrichshafen Airport and displays restored Dornier aviation technology as well as modern space technology.

AERO Friedrichshafen is a yearly aviation conference that hosted an attendance of 33,400 in 2011, and 30,800 in 2012. Aero 2013 took place on 24–27 April 2013 at Friedrichshafen Airport.

Other
Rolls-Royce Power Systems AG (MTU), the German engine manufacturing company owned by Rolls-Royce is also located in Friedrichshafen.

Apart from industry and tourism, various international regular trade fairs, such as Aero (aviation technology), Interboot (water sports), OutDoor, Motorradwelt (Motorbikes), Eurobike (bicycles) and Tuning World Bodensee (car tuning) are important economical factors. There is a large fair ground (Messe Friedrichshafen) near Friedrichshafen airport where all these and many more trade fairs take place every year. Furthermore, the Graf-Zeppelin-Haus cultural centre has become a popular location for congresses, conferences, musical and other events.

Friedrichshafen is the location for Europe's largest ham radio convention.

Education

Zeppelin University, a private research university, is the only private university in the state of Baden-Württemberg to have received the rare right to confer PhD titles to its students. Only founded in 2003, its Cultural & Communication Management programme has been already ranked the best university programme in that field in German speaking countries, according to the prestigious CHE ranking. The programme in Public Management & Governance was ranked 4th while the programme in Corporate Management & Economics was ranked 6th among all examined German, Austrian, Swiss and Dutch universities (figures from 2011). Zeppelin University holds the title of the 'most committed' university in Germany with regard to civil society issues (Stifterverband für die deutsche Wissenschaft/Stiftung Mercator 2011). Ravensburg University of Cooperative Education also has a campus in Friedrichshafen.

Sports
VfB Friedrichshafen is a professional volleyball team based on Friedrichshafen. It is one of the top teams in Bundesliga.

Culture

Music 

The Seehasen-Fanfarenzug was founded in 1956 on the occasion of the Seehasenfest and Erich Deisel, a teacher at the Graf Zeppelin Gymnasium. At that time the club consisted of four drummers and two fanfare players. In 1959 the first typical yellow and red costumes reminiscent of the character from the Spanish era were designed. In 1972 the fanfare band took part in the German Championship of Fanfare Bands and came eighth place. Up until the 50th anniversary in 2006, he organized many concerts abroad and won several prizes in competitions across Germany. 

The Friedrichshafen Music School was founded in 1953 as a municipal educational institution. In 2003 it moved to the newly built building near the Graf Zeppelin Gymnasium.

Festivals 
Friedrichshafen has a number of town and local festivals that are held annually. Since 1985, the Kulturufer has taken place at the beginning of the summer holidays, a ten-day tent festival on the shores of Lake Constance. The performances range from music events to cabaret, drama and dance to readings, acrobatics and street theater. There is also a daily theater program for children in the tent. The Kulturufer is organized by the Culture Office and the Office for Family, Youth and Social Affairs.

One of the most famous and oldest festivals in Friedrichshafen is the Seehasenfest, a local kids festival that has been taking place since the post-war period.

Transport
Friedrichshafen Stadt station enjoys train services at regular intervals to Lindau and Ulm, as well as to Basel in Switzerland.

A car ferry service links Friedrichshafen to Romanshorn in Switzerland, and various other towns around the lake can also be reached by ferry. Since 2005, a fast Catamaran ship connection has been in service between Friedrichshafen and Konstanz.

Friedrichshafen has a local airport called Friedrichshafen Airport which offers, among other services, daily international connections provided mainly by Lufthansa CityLine and Turkish Airlines. The Zeppelin manufacturing company Luftschiffbau Zeppelin (LZ) was re-established in 1993, and a commercial airline Deutsche Zeppelin Reederei (DZR) began flying passenger service from Friedrichshafen Airport in 2001. , 12 scheduled routes were offered with additional flights to selected cities.

The nearest big cities are Konstanz, Ravensburg, Bregenz, St. Gallen, Ulm, Munich, Zürich, and Stuttgart.

Notable People

Before 1900 
 Matteo Pertsch (1769–1834), Austrian classical architect responsible for many historic structures in Trieste
 Frederick Miller (1824–1888), brewery owner in Milwaukee, Wisconsin, USA
 Heinrich Lanz (1838–1905), agricultural machinery manufacturers Heinrich Lanz AG, Lanz Bulldog
 Wilhelm Maybach (1846–1929), engine designer and industrialist
 Barbara Margaretha Meta von Salis (1855–1929), Swiss feminist and historian
 Hugo Eckener (1868–1954), manager of the Luftschiffbau Zeppelin during the inter-war years
 Hermann Blau (1871–1944), engineer and chemist and inventor of Blau gas
 Ludwig Dürr (1878–1956), airship designer
 Claude Dornier (1884–1969), airplane builder and founder of Dornier GmbH
 Friedrich von Arnauld de la Perière (1888–1969), aviator
 Franz-Zeno Diemer (1889–1954), flight pioneer
 Oberleutnant Hans Bethge (1890–1918), World War I flying ace and aerial commander
 Richard Vogt (1894–1979), engineer and aircraft designer

Since 1900 
 Alfonsas Dargis (1909–1996), Lithuanian painter, graphic artist, set designer and poet
 Liselotte Herrmann (1909–1938), Communist Resistance fighter in Nazi Germany
 Friedrich Jung (1915–1997), doctor and leading academic and research pharmacologist in the GDR
 Albrecht Roser (1922–2011), puppeteer
 Princess Marie Alexandra of Schleswig-Holstein (1929–2000), wife of local restaurateur
 Carl, Duke of Württemberg (born 1936), head of the House of Württemberg
 Nico Stehr (born 1942), university professor
 Helmut Willke (born 1945), sociologist who studies the effect of globalization on modern society
 Stefan Waggershausen (born 1949), singer, composer, and songwriter
 Laurent Gathier (born in 1953 in Friedrichshafen), French engineer and space pioneer
 Patrick A. Baeuerle (born 1957), molecular biologist
 Peter Rundel (born 1958), violinist and conductor
 Hubert Knoblauch (born 1959), sociologist
 Alissa Walser (born 1961), writer, daughter of poet Martin Walser
 Tasos Zembylas (born 1962), philosopher and social scientist
 Stefan Sommer (born 1963), Chief Executive Officer of ZF Friedrichshafen AG
 Philippe Bühler (born 1981), singer
 Alicia von Rittberg (born 1993), actress and local student
 Philipp Riederle (born 1994), author, consultant and podcaster

Sport 
 Jörg Diesch (born 1951), sailor, Olympian winner in 1976
 Eckart Diesch (born 1954), sailor, Olympic athlete 1976
 John Jurkovic (born 1967), former American football player currently employed as a US broadcaster
 Stefanie Rothweiler (born 1979), Olympian participant in sailing
 Steffen Wohlfarth (born 1983), footballer
 Kerstin Wohlbold (born 1984), handball player
 Max Günthör (born 1985), volleyball player
 Chantal Laboureur (born 1990), volleyball and beach volleyball player
 Simon Zoller (born 1991), footballer
 Liane Lippert (born 1998), cyclist
 Giulia Gwinn (born 1999), footballer

Twin towns – sister cities

Friedrichshafen is twinned with:

 Delitzsch, Germany
 Imperia, Italy
 Peoria, United States  	
 Polotsk, Belarus
 Saint-Dié-des-Vosges, France
 Sarajevo, Bosnia and Herzegovina

The relationships to the twin cities are supported by the local government together with twin city associations. In Friedrichshafen there had been founded the associations Freundeskreis Polozk, Peoria Club, Arbeitskreis S.Dié and Amici di Imperia.

Friedrichshafen has friendly relations with:
 Tsuchiura, Japan

See also

Dornier Consulting

References

External links

 
Friedrichshafen Tourism 
Zeppelin museum (English version available)
Bodensee Airport Friedrichshafen (English version)
MTU Friedrichshafen 
ZF Friedrichshafen 
Zeppelin University
Graf-Zeppelin-Haus cultural centre
Count Zeppelin (Highland Pipes and Drums)
Ham radio convention
Südkurier (Südkurier) Local newspaper for Friedrichshafen (in German)

 
Populated places on Lake Constance
Bodenseekreis
Free imperial cities
Württemberg